Cameo is an American funk band that formed in 1974. Cameo was initially a 14-member group known as the New York City Players; this name was later changed to Cameo.

As of the first half of 2009, some of the original members continued to perform together. Two other original members were hired by the hip hop group Outkast. In 2015, Cameo announced a new residency show at the Westgate Las Vegas Resort & Casino, opening in March 2016. On February 20, 2019, Larry Blackmon of Cameo announced "El Passo", the first new single from the band in 19 years. Cameo topped the R&B charts for more than a decade, has sold more than 18 million albums and is considered one of the most popular funk bands of its era.

Background

1974–1979: Formation and early years 
Formed by Larry Blackmon in 1974 as the New York City Players the band was signed by Casablanca Records to its Chocolate City imprint in 1975 as “The Players”. However, according to original band member Nathan Leftenant, the group soon changed its name after the threat of legal action by Mercury Records due to the name “The Players” being too similar to Ohio Players, who recorded for Mercury at the time. The name Cameo was derived from a brand of cigarettes sold in Canada that the band saw during a visit to that country.  Prior to this, Blackmon, keyboardist Gregory Johnson, and the late Gwen Guthrie formed the band East Coast, together with James Wheeler (alto saxophone), Melvin Whay (bass), Michael Harris (percussion), and Haras Fyre (also known as Pat Grant) on trombone. They released one self-titled album in 1973 on the independent label Encounter.

Cameo started with a deep, funk sound, but it was obvious from the start their sights were set on the dance floor. Their first album was Cardiac Arrest which featured its first hit single, "Rigor Mortis". Follow up albums We All Know Who We Are, Ugly Ego, and Secret Omen contained dance floor songs such as "I Just Want To Be" and “It’s Serious”; which was used for a dance contest scene in the 1978 film Thank God It's Friday. The band's debut single "Find My Way" was a disco song that was also used in the film, and was included on the Thank God It's Friday soundtrack. ("Find My Way" was their cover of a 1972 Three Degrees and a 1969 Tymes tune.)

1979–1992: Mainstream breakthrough 

The 1979 single “I Just Want To Be” was Cameo's breakthrough hit. It reached number 3 on the Billboard Magazine R&B Chart, and along with the follow up single, the Top 10 R&B ballad “Sparkle”, pushed the album Secret Omen to Gold status with sales of over 500,000 copies; the band's first album to achieve this status. Their next album, Cameosis, came out in 1980 and also achieved Gold status thanks in large part to the funk classic “Shake Your Pants”, the mid-tempo single “We’re Goin’ Out Tonight”, and the ballad “Why Have I Lost You” (a re-recording of a song from their 1978 album We All Know Who We Are). It reached number 1 on the Billboard R&B chart and number 25 on the Billboard 200 chart, their highest positions yet. Their second album of 1980, Feel Me, 1981's Knights of the Sound Table and 1982's Alligator Woman also went Gold and saw the band playing up their eclectic style. The band released She's Strange in 1984, which performed well and hit number 1 on the Billboard R&B chart and 26 on the Billboard 200. The album's title track, eponymous single became the band's first number 1 R&B hit, as well as their first charting pop single; reaching number 47 on the Billboard Hot 100.

1985's album Single Life, featuring the title track and "Attack Me with Your Love", hit number 2 on the Top R&B chart and continued the band's momentum, paving the way for what was to come the following year. The single "Word Up!" was released in 1986 and reached number 1 on the Billboard R&B chart, plus number 6 on the Billboard Hot 100; becoming the band's biggest single on the pop chart. The follow up single “Candy” reached number 1 R&B and 21 pop, while their next release, “Back and Forth”, went to number 3 R&B and number 50 pop. The album also hit numbers 8 and 1 on the Billboard 200 and Top R&B charts respectively, becoming their highest-charting album.

Two years later, Cameo released Machismo to mixed critical reviews and dropped to chart at numbers 10 and 56 on the Top R&B and Billboard 200 respectively. Cameo then followed up with 1990's Real Men... Wear Black and 1992's Emotional Violence. The previous release was followed by two compilation albums in between the time of their next recording.

1994–2000: Later years 
In 1994, In the Face of Funk was released on the band's independent label and hit 10 on the Top R&B chart. This album was then followed by a 6-year unofficial hiatus with several compilation releases, until the next album Sexy Sweet Thing in 2000. The album hit 64 on the Top R&B chart, and is their most recent charting release.

2000–2016: Inactivity/unofficial hiatus 
In 2001, a sample from the band's single "Candy" was used in the Mariah Carey single "Loverboy." The song hit No. 2 on the Billboard Hot 100 and Blackmon was given a co-songwriting credit.

These years saw a great period of inactivity and unofficial hiatus, in which time 6 compilation albums were released. The compilation albums released in this period were, in chronological order: The Hits Collection (2000), 20th Century Masters - The Millennium Collection: The Best of Cameo (2001), Anthology (2002), Classic Cameo (2003), The Best of Cameo (2004), Gold (2005), and The Definitive Collection (2006).

2016–present: Recent years 
In March 2016, Cameo began a year-long Las Vegas residency show at the Westgate Las Vegas Resort & Casino.

Associated members 
Aaron Mills continues to tour with Cameo as well as other artists. He has worked with Outkast, playing on their singles "Ms. Jackson" and "Prototype", among other tracks. Ex-Cameo vocalist John Kellogg became an entertainment lawyer, representing such artists as The O'Jays, the late Gerald Levert, and LSG. He also pursued a career in music industry higher education, becoming Assistant Chair of the Music Business/Management department at Berklee College of Music in Boston, Massachusetts. Gregory B. Johnson has released two CDs on his own label, Allspice Record Co. — in 2007 "A New Hip", which is a smooth Jazz CD, and in 2012 Funk Funk (Just For A Little Time), an urban funk CD.

Style
Cameo began as a horn-oriented funk band in the 1970s, influenced by Parliament-Funkadelic. By the 1980s, Cameo expanded their sound with influences from pop, hip hop, rock and reggae, and placed more emphasis on keyboards and drum machines.

Discography

 Cardiac Arrest (1977)
 We All Know Who We Are (1977)
 Ugly Ego (1978)
 Secret Omen (1979)
 Cameosis (1980)
 Feel Me (1980)

 Knights of the Sound Table (1981)
 Alligator Woman (1982)
 Style (1983)
 She's Strange (1984)
 Single Life (1985)
 Word Up! (1986)

 Machismo (1988)
 Real Men... Wear Black (1990)
 Emotional Violence (1991)
 In the Face of Funk (1994)
 Sexy Sweet Thing (2000)

See also
List of Number 1 Dance Hits (United States)
List of artists who reached number one on the US Dance chart

References

External links
Official website

Cameo at Discogs
Jeff Nelson Interview NAMM Oral History Library (2022)

American funk musical groups
Musical groups from New York (state)
Musical groups established in 1974
Reprise Records artists